The discography of Rickie Lee Jones, an American singer, songwriter, musician, and author, consists of 14 studio albums, two live albums, two compilation albums, one extended play, one video album, and 22 singles, on Warner Bros. Records, Geffen Records, Reprise Records, Artemis Records, V2 Records, New West Records, Fantasy Records, Rhino Entertainment, and the Other Side of Desire Records.

In the United States, Jones has one Platinum-certified album and two Gold-certified albums. In the United Kingdom, she has two Silver-certified albums.

Albums

Studio albums

 Notes
 Peaked position on Billboard Top Contemporary Jazz chart.

Live albums

Compilation albums

Extended plays

Singles

Video albums

Other contributions
 Credits adapted from AllMusic.
Guest vocals on "Sidekick" from Chuck E. Weiss' album The Other Side of Town (1981)
Guest vocals on "Between a Laugh and a Tear" from John Cougar Mellencamp's album Scarecrow (1985)
Lead vocals on "The Moon Is Made of Gold" and "Autumn Leaves" from Rob Wasserman's album Duets (1988)
Duet vocals on "Makin' Whoopee!" from Dr. John's album In a Sentimental Mood (1989)
Duet vocals on "Easter Parade" from The Blue Nile's single "Headlights on the Parade" (1989)
Lead vocals on "O Holy Night" from The Chieftains' album The Bells of Dublin (1991)
Guest vocals on "North Dakota" from Lyle Lovett's album Joshua Judges Ruth (1991) and Live in Texas (1999)
Little Fluffy Clouds (1990–93) – Spoken word sampled by British ambient-house group, The Orb, charting three times on the UK Singles Chart: No. 87 (1990), No. 95 (1991), and No. 10 (1993).
Production and harmony vocals on Leo Kottke's album Peculiaroso (1994)
Guest vocals on "Spirit" from Wild Colonials' album This Can't Be Life (1996)
Duet vocals on "I Scare Myself" and "Driftin" from Dan Hicks and His Hot Licks' album Beatin' the Heat (2000)
WFUV: City Folk Live VII (2004) – "Mink Coat at the Bus Stop"
Duet vocals on "Comes Love" from Willie Nelson's album Outlaws and Angels (2004)
Lead vocals on "Been on a Train" from the Laura Nyro tribute album Map to the Treasure: Reimagining Laura Nyro by Billy Childs. (2014)
Spoken word on "From Space" from Anders Osborne's album Spacedust & Oceanviews (2016)
"Dark Was the Night - Cold Was the Ground" from the Blind Willie Johnson tribute album God Don't Never Change: The Songs of Blind Willie Johnson (2016)
Guest vocals on "Roll Um Easy" from Jonah Tolchin's album Fires for the Cold (2019)

References

External links
Rickie Lee Jones's Official Website

Discography
Discographies of American artists
Pop music discographies
Rock music discographies